George Jelbart (born 12 April 1982) is an Australian rower. He competed in the men's lightweight double sculls event at the 2004 Summer Olympics.

References

1982 births
Living people
Australian male rowers
Olympic rowers of Australia
Rowers at the 2004 Summer Olympics
Rowers from Melbourne
21st-century Australian people